In mathematics, and particularly singularity theory, the Milnor number, named after John Milnor, is an invariant of a function germ.

If f is a complex-valued holomorphic function germ then the Milnor number of f, denoted μ(f), is either a nonnegative integer, or is infinite. It can be considered both a geometric invariant and an algebraic invariant. This is why it plays an important role in algebraic geometry and singularity theory.

Algebraic definition 
Consider a holomorphic complex function germ 
 
and denote by  the ring of all function germs . 

In particular, the multiplicity of the gradient

is finite by an application of Rückert's Nullstellensatz.

Note that the multiplicity of the gradient is finite if and only if the origin is an isolated critical point of f.

Geometric interpretation 
Milnor originally introduced  in geometric terms in the following way. It is also diffeomorphic to the fiber of the Milnor fibration map.

The Milnor fiber  is a smooth manifold of dimension  and has the same  homotopy type as a bouquet of  spheres . For example, a complex plane curve near every singular point  has its Milnor fiber homotopic to a wedge of  circles (Milnor number is a local property, so it can have different values at different singular points).

Thus we have equalities
Milnor number   = number of spheres in the wedge = middle Betti number of  = degree of the map  on   = multiplicity of the gradient 

Another way of looking at Milnor number is by perturbation. We say that a point is a degenerate singular point, or that f has a degenerate singularity, at  if  is a singular point and the Hessian matrix of all second order partial derivatives has zero determinant at :

We assume that f has a degenerate singularity at 0. We can speak about the multiplicity of this degenerate singularity by thinking about how many points are infinitesimally glued. If we now perturb the image of f in a certain stable way the isolated degenerate singularity at 0 will split up into other isolated singularities which are non-degenerate! The number of such isolated non-degenerate singularities will be the number of points that have been infinitesimally glued.

Precisely, we take another function germ g which is non-singular at the origin and consider the new function germ h := f + εg where ε is very small. When ε = 0 then h = f. The function h is called the morsification of f. It is very difficult to compute the singularities of h, and indeed it may be computationally impossible. This  number of points that have been infinitesimally glued, this local multiplicity of f, is exactly the Milnor number of f.

Further contributions give meaning to Milnor number in terms of dimension of the space of versal deformations, i.e. the Milnor number is the minimal dimension of parameter space of deformations that carry all information about initial singularity.

Examples 
Here we give some worked examples in two variables. Working with only one is too simple and does not give a feel for the techniques, whereas working with three variables can be quite tricky. Two is a nice number. Also we stick to polynomials. If f is only holomorphic and not a polynomial, then we could have worked with the power series expansion of f.

1 

Consider a function germ with a non-degenerate singularity at 0, say . The Jacobian ideal is just . We next compute the local algebra:

To see why this is true we can use Hadamard's lemma which says that we can write any function  as

So, modulo functional multiples of x and y, we can write h as a constant. The space of constant functions is spanned by 1, hence  

It follows that μ(f) = 1. It is easy to check that for any function germ g with a non-degenerate singularity at 0 we get μ(g) = 1.

Note that applying this method to a non-singular function germ g we get μ(g) = 0.

2 

Let , then

So in this case .

3 

One can show that if  then 

This can be explained by the fact that f is singular at every point of the x-axis.

Versal Deformations 
Let f have finite Milnor number μ, and let  be a basis for the local algebra, considered as a vector space. Then a miniversal deformation of f is given by

where .
These deformations (or unfoldings) are of great interest in much of science.

Invariance
We can collect function germs together to construct equivalence classes. One standard equivalence is A-equivalence. We say that two function germs  are A-equivalent if there exist diffeomorphism germs  and  such that : there exists a diffeomorphic change of variable in both domain and range which takes f to g.

If f and g are A-equivalent then μ(f) = μ(g).

Nevertheless, the Milnor number does not offer a complete invariant for function germs, i.e. the converse is false: there exist function germs f and g with μ(f) = μ(g) which are not A-equivalent. We have  but f and g are clearly not A-equivalent since the Hessian matrix of f is equal to zero while that of g is not (and the rank of the Hessian is an A-invariant, as is easy to see).

References 

 
 
 
 

Singularity theory
Algebraic geometry